Woodthorpe is a hamlet just south of Loughborough and former civil parish, now in the unparished area of Loughborough, in the Charnwood district, in Leicestershire, England. In 1931 the parish had a population of 53.

In the Imperial Gazetteer of England and Wales (1870–72) John Marius Wilson described Woodthorpe:

Woodthorpe became a parish in 1866, on 1 April 1935 the parish was abolished and merged with Loughborough, part also went to Quorndon and Woodhouse.

References

Hamlets in Leicestershire
Former civil parishes in Leicestershire
Borough of Charnwood